Club Deportivo Lozaro is Mexican football club that plays in the Segunda División Profesional. The club is based in  Yautepec, Morelos.

See also
Football in Mexico

External links
http://www.segundadivisionfmf.org.mx/equipo.asp?ID=104

Football clubs in Morelos
Association football clubs established in 2008
2008 establishments in Mexico